Raz Qand (also Romanized as Rāz Qand) is a village in Qasabeh-ye Sharqi Rural District, in the Central District of Sabzevar County, Razavi Khorasan Province, Iran. At the 2006 census, its population was 268, in 90 families.

References 

Populated places in Sabzevar County